Hongfu Temple or  may refer to:

 Hongfu Temple (Shanghai), in Fengxian District of Shanghai, China
 Hongfu Temple (Guiyang), in Guiyang, Guizhou, China

Buddhist temple disambiguation pages